The 2001 NCAA Division III women's basketball tournament was the 20th annual tournament hosted by the NCAA to determine the national champion of Division III women's collegiate basketball in the United States.

Three-time defending champions Washington University in St. Louis defeated Messiah University in the championship game, 67–45, to claim the Bears' fourth Division III national title, their fourth of four consecutive.

The championship rounds were hosted by Western Connecticut State University in Danbury, Connecticut.

Bracket

Final Four

All-tournament team
 Tasha Rodgers, Washington University in St. Louis
 Jennifer Rudis, Washington University in St. Louis
 Katy Sturtz, Ohio Wesleyan
 Amy Hitz, Messiah
 Brianne Bognanno, Emmanuel (MA)

See also
 2001 NCAA Division I women's basketball tournament
 2001 NCAA Division II women's basketball tournament
 2001 NAIA Division I women's basketball tournament
 2001 NAIA Division II women's basketball tournament
 2001 NCAA Division III men's basketball tournament

References

 
NCAA Division III women's basketball tournament
2001 in sports in Connecticut
Washington University Bears
Messiah Falcons